Stephen Kissa (born 1 December 1995) is a Ugandan long-distance runner who specializes in the 5000 metres.

He finished 52nd at the 2017 World Cross Country Championships and competed at the 2017 World Championships 5000 metres without reaching the final. The next year he finished 8th in the 5000 metres at the 2018 African Championships.

His personal best time is 13:10.93 minutes, achieved in July 2018 at Athletissima in Lausanne. He has 7:54.32 minutes in the 3000 metres, achieved in July 2018 in Rabat. He won his last race of 2018 at the 15 kilometres road race Montferland Run in the Netherlands.

He competed in the 10,000 metres at the 2020 Summer Olympics. In the race, he created a huge lead ahead of the pack early on and later dropped out with nine laps remaining. Kissa later explained that he was attempting to create a fast-paced race in hopes of helping teammates Joshua Cheptegei and Jacob Kiplimo.

References

1995 births
Living people
Ugandan male long-distance runners
Ugandan male cross country runners
World Athletics Championships athletes for Uganda
Athletes (track and field) at the 2019 African Games
African Games competitors for Uganda
Athletes (track and field) at the 2020 Summer Olympics
Olympic athletes of Uganda
20th-century Ugandan people
21st-century Ugandan people